The Yom River is a river in Thailand. It is the main tributary of the Nan River (which itself is a tributary of the Chao Phraya River). The Yom River has its source in the Phi Pan Nam Range  in Pong District, Phayao Province. Leaving Phayao, it flows through Phrae and Sukhothai as the main water resource of both provinces before it joins the Nan River at Chum Saeng District, Nakhon Sawan Province.

Tributaries

Tributaries of the Yom include Nam Mae Phong, Ngao River, Nam Ngim, Huai Mae Sin, Nam Suat, Nam Pi, Mae Mok, Huai Mae Phuak, Mae Ramphan, Nam Mae Lai, Nam Khuan, and Nam Mae Kham Mi.

Yom Basin
The Yom Basin is part of the Greater Nan Basin and the Chao Phraya Watershed.

A controversial large dam was planned on the Yom River in the central area of the Phi Pan Nam mountains in Kaeng Suea Ten in 1991 but the project was later abandoned. The debate about the dam was opened again in 2011. Currently a proposal is being debated to build two smaller dams on the Yom River in the area instead of the Kaeng Suea Ten mega-dam.

Protected areas
The Yom River flows through Mae Yom National Park in Phrae Province.

References

External links

 Living River Siam
Bangkok Post - Living in the ugly shadow of the kaeng sua ten dam
A Never-ending Story… Living with the Forest and Protection of the river fish

Rivers of Thailand
Nan River